The Philosopher is a long running periodical, established in 1923 by the Philosophical Society of England. Originally in print format, following a split in the mid-2010s the publication now exists in two competing formats.

History 
The Philosopher is a long running periodical that was established in 1923 in order to provide a forum for new ideas across the entire range of philosophical topics, in the clearest and plainest language. Its first issue quoted A.S. Rappoport in A Primer of Philosophy (1904) that:There is a prevalent notion that philosophy is a pursuit to be followed only by expert thinkers on abstract subjects, that it deals with the pale ghosts of conceptions whose domain is abstract thought, but which have no application to real life. This is a mistake... Man sees the various phenomena of life and nature, forms conceptions and ideas, and then tries to reason and to find out the relation existing between these various facts and phenomena... When man acts in this way we say he philosophises.

The Philosopher was the official publication of the Philosophical Society of England, a charitable organization founded ten years earlier in 1913. The society existed "to promote the study of practical philosophy among the general public", to bring together professional philosophers and non-professionals, to bring philosophical ideas and problems to the public attention, and to encourage wider discussion of both traditional and topical philosophical issues. As part of fulfilling these functions, the society founded The Philosopher as its own journal in addition to running local groups, lectures, workshops, and conferences. The Society ceased to exist in 2014 although Michael Bavidge claimed both its name and assets for his own local group of the society, the 'Newcastle Group'. A

A series of arguments internal to the Philosophical Society of England in 2014, lead to the publication being split into two formats; an online only edition, led by long term editor Martin Cohen, and a print only edition originally led by Michael Bavidge. Both publications claim to be direct continuations of The Philosopher prior to the split.

Online Edition 

The online edition of The Philosopher describes itself as "a forum for short, original, brilliant and accessible articles". Articles are edited for clarity by the editorial team, with a focus on making content "clear to the interested reader". The online edition prints articles on a wide range of philosophical topics and book reviews. Recent notable contributors to the online edition include Mel Thompson, and Urmila Bhoola.

Print Edition 
The print edition of The Philosopher describes itself as a "forum for cutting-edge philosophical discussions to take place, prioritizing exciting up-and-coming thinkers as much as well-established leading figures." The publication is written for the general non-academic public, with a focus on accessibility.

Topics range from core philosophical problems to discussions of current social and political issues. Recent contributors to the print edition include Kathleen Stock, Mary Midgley, Timothy Williamson, Jason Stanley, Linda Martín Alcoff.

Notable articles 
Historically interesting or notable articles that were identified and recovered by Martin Cohen for the online edition include:
 G. K. Chesterton on "The Need for a Philosophy", Volume 1, 1923
 "Individual Psychology and Education", by John Dewey, Volume XII, 1934
 Erwin Schrödinger on "Science, Art and Play", Volume XIII 1935
 Moritz Schlick on "Unanswerable Questions", Volume XIII, 1935

Editors 
The editors-in-chief of the journal are:

 1923–1948: Ada Sheridan, W. H. S. Dumphreys, Thomas Greenwood
 1949–1972: C. S. Flick, Victor Rienaecker, A. J. Sinclair-Burton
 1973–1988: George Colbran, Alan Holloway, Geoffrey Brown
 1989–2013: Keith Dowling, Michael Bavidge, Martin Cohen
 2013–present: Martin Cohen (for the online edition)
 2013-2018: Michael Bavidge (for the print edition)
 2018–present: Anthony Morgan (for the print edition)

See also 
 List of philosophy journals

References

External links 
 Online Edition Website: http://www.the-philosopher.co.uk
 Print Edition Website: https://www.thephilosopher1923.org/
 The Philosophical Society of England Website: http://www.philsoceng.uk

Publications established in 1923
Philosophy journals
English-language journals
Academic journals published by learned and professional societies
Quarterly journals